Zariquieya is a genus of beetles in the family Carabidae, containing the following species:

 Zariquieya boumortensis Faille, Fresneda & Bourdeau, 2011
 Zariquieya troglodytes (Jeannel, 1924)

References

Pterostichinae